Dracophyllum sayeri is a non-herbaceous plant in the genus Dracophyllum, endemic to North Queensland. The plant has green leaves approximately 20-50 centimetres in length when mature. Inflorescence are approximately 15-25 centimetres in length and range from a light red colour to cream.

The species has been found in Goldsborough Valley State Forest and Mount Lewis National Park.

References

sayeri
Taxa named by Ferdinand von Mueller